King Salmon is a census-designated place (CDP) in Bristol Bay Borough in the U.S. state of Alaska. As of the 2020 census the population was 307, down from 374 in 2010. It is home to Katmai National Park and Preserve. 
King Salmon is the borough seat of neighboring Lake and Peninsula Borough, but does not serve that purpose in its own borough, whose borough seat is in Naknek.

Geography
King Salmon is on the north bank of the Naknek River on the Alaska Peninsula, about  upriver from Naknek, near Naknek Lake.

Climate
King Salmon has a subarctic climate (Köppen Dfc) even though it is at 58° North. Temperatures, especially extreme ones, are much less moderate than in the subpolar oceanic climate of the Pacific Ocean side of the Alaska Peninsula; however, average temperatures in winter are still milder than some locations in the coterminous United States, such as Fargo, ND. The town lies just below the southern limit of sporadic permafrost in Alaska, and is strongly sheltered from the extremely wet Aleutian Low which drops most of its moisture on the opposite (eastern) side of the mountains. It is a lot colder than fellow west-coast climates of Europe on the same latitude due to the influence of the Siberian High on Bering Sea surface temperatures. In summer, King Salmon catches up to similar latitudes in the British Isles, where the difference is much stronger in winter. The area remains quite a bit colder year round than around the Baltic Sea in a similar west-facing location.

Winter days are sometimes very cold due to winds from the interior during cold waves. During the 1991–2020 normals, the coldest daily maximum averaged . Warm summer nights are a rarity, although  was recorded in August 1919. The warmest low in a regular year averages a modest .

Demographics

King Salmon first appeared on the 1960 U.S. Census as an unincorporated village. It was made a census-designated place (CDP) as of the 1980 census.

As of the census of 2000, there were 442 people, 196 households, and 105 families residing in the CDP.  The population density was 2.6 people per square mile (1.0/km2).  There were 343 housing units at an average density of 2.0 per square mile (0.8/km2).  The racial makeup of the CDP was 66.29% White, 1.13% Black or African American, 28.96% Native American, 0.23% Asian (i.e. 1 person), 0.23% from other races, and 3.17% from two or more races.  0.45% of the population were Hispanic or Latino of any race.

There were 196 households, out of which 30.1% had children under the age of 18 living with them, 44.4% were married couples living together, 4.6% had a female householder with no husband present, and 46.4% were non-families. 41.3% of all households were made up of individuals, and 1.5% had someone living alone who was 65 years of age or older.  The average household size was 2.26 and the average family size was 3.17.

In the CDP, the population was spread out, with 26.2% under the age of 18, 7.0% from 18 to 24, 35.7% from 25 to 44, 28.1% from 45 to 64, and 2.9% who were 65 years of age or older.  The median age was 38 years. For every 100 females, there were 122.1 males.  For every 100 females age 18 and over, there were 131.2 males.

The median income for a household in the CDP was $54,375, and the median income for a family was $64,375. Males had a median income of $45,000 versus $35,500 for females. The per capita income for the CDP was $26,755.  About 8.8% of families and 12.4% of the population were below the poverty line, including 17.5% of those under age 18 and none of those age 65 or over.

Parks
Katmai National Park and Preserve

History 
In the 1930s, the U.S. government built an air navigation silo at the site of present-day King Salmon. At the beginning of World War II, the U.S. Army Air Forces built an air base around the silo. It was maintained by the Civil Aeronautics Administration throughout the war.

Other government agencies, such as the National Park Service, Alaska Department of Fish and Game, and the United States Weather Bureau, built facilities at King Salmon. The King Salmon Inn opened in 1956.

King Salmon is now a government, transportation, and service and shipment center for the commercial red salmon and sport fishing industries.

The Air Force base closed in 1994, and is kept in caretaker status (mothballed) by Anchorage-based Chugach Federal Solutions, Inc. King Salmon Airport is now a public access airport.

King Salmon is one of the sites of Super Dual Auroral Radar Network.

In 2010, a local National Weather Service employee and his wife were involved in an Islamic domestic terrorism plot that had proceeded to the operational phase.  A hit list of 20 people that included media and military personnel was found.

References

External links

Borough seats in Alaska
Census-designated places in Alaska
Census-designated places in Bristol Bay Borough, Alaska
Road-inaccessible communities of Alaska